p-Coumaric acid is an organic compound with the formula HOC6H4CH=CHCO2H. It is one of the three isomers of hydroxycinnamic acid. It is a white solid that is only slightly soluble in water but very soluble in ethanol and diethyl ether.

Natural occurrences 
It is a precursor to many natural products, especially lignols, precursors to the woody mass that comprise many plants. Of the myriad occurrences, p-coumaric acid can be found in Gnetum cleistostachyum.

In food 
p-Coumaric acid can be found in a wide variety of edible plants and fungi such as peanuts, navy beans, tomatoes, carrots, basil and garlic. It is found in wine and vinegar. It is also found in barley grain.

p-Coumaric acid from pollen is a constituent of honey.

Derivatives 
p-Coumaric acid glucoside can also be found in commercial breads containing flaxseed. Diesters of p-coumaric acid can be found in carnauba wax.

Biosynthesis 
It is biosynthesized from cinnamic acid by the action of the P450-dependent enzyme 4-cinnamic acid hydroxylase (C4H).
    

It is also produced from L-tyrosine by the action of tyrosine ammonia lyase (TAL).
     + NH3 + H+

Biosynthetic building block 
p-Coumaric acid is the precursor of 4-ethylphenol produced by the yeast Brettanomyces in wine. The enzyme cinnamate decarboxylase catalyzes the conversion of p-coumaric acid into 4-vinylphenol. Vinyl phenol reductase then catalyzes the reduction of 4-vinylphenol to 4-ethylphenol. Coumaric acid is sometimes added to microbiological media, enabling the positive identification of Brettanomyces by smell.

cis-p-Coumarate glucosyltransferase is an enzyme that uses uridine diphosphate glucose and cis-p-coumarate to produce 4′-O-β-D-glucosyl-cis-p-coumarate and uridine diphosphate (UDP). This enzyme belongs to the family of glycosyltransferases, specifically the hexosyltransferases.

Phloretic acid, found in the rumen of sheep fed with dried grass, is produced by hydrogenation of the 2-propenoic side chain of p-coumaric acid.

The enzyme, resveratrol synthase, also known as stilbene synthase, catalyzes the synthesis of resveratrol ultimately from a tetraketide derived from 4-coumaroyl CoA.

p-Coumaric acid is a cofactor of photoactive yellow proteins (PYP), a homologous group of proteins found in many eubacteria.

See also 
o-coumaric acid
m-coumaric acid
 Coumarin
 Coumaroyl-Coenzyme A
 Ferulic acid
 Cinnamic acid
 Phenolic content in wine
 p-Coumaroylated anthocyanins

References 

Hydroxycinnamic acids
Vinylogous carboxylic acids